Mahmoud Ben Salah(born 6 May 1988) is a Tunisian footballer who currently plays for Al-Taraji as a defender.

References

External links
 

1988 births
Living people
Tunisian footballers
Tunisia international footballers
Tunisian expatriate footballers
CS Sfaxien players
Damac FC players
Al-Bukayriyah FC players
Al-Diriyah Club players
Al-Riyadh SC players
Al-Taraji Club players
Tunisian Ligue Professionnelle 1 players
Saudi First Division League players
Saudi Second Division players
Expatriate footballers in Saudi Arabia
Tunisian expatriate sportspeople in Saudi Arabia
Association football defenders